Life Is Not for Cowards is a 2012 German drama film directed by André Erkau.

Cast 
 Wotan Wilke Möhring as Markus
  as Kim
 Christine Schorn as Gerlinde
 Frederick Lau as Alex
 Rosalie Thomass as Paula
  as Franz
  as Sven
  as Babette Färber
  as Alex Vater
 Nina Petri as Alex Mutter
  as Punk
  as Obdachloser
  as Arzt
 Adam Bousdoukos as Kurt

References

External links 

2012 drama films
2012 films
German drama films
2010s German films